Rajeev Raghavan is a fisheries scientist and aquatic conservation biologist known for his work on the freshwater fishes of the Indian subcontinent. He is currently an Assistant Professor at the Department of Fisheries Resource Management, Kerala University of Fisheries and Ocean Studies, Kochi, India, and the South Asia Chair of the IUCN’s Freshwater Fish Specialist Group.

Education and Career
After completing his undergraduate and graduate degrees in fisheries science and Aquaculture, and a PhD in Fish Ecology, Rajeev received his postdoctoral training, and worked as a visiting/guest researcher at various universities in Asia and Europe. Prior to his current appointment with the Kerala University of Fisheries and Ocean Studies (KUFOS), Kochi, India, Rajeev also worked as a Lecturer in Fisheries Science at the St. Albert's College, Kochi, India (where he also co-founded the Conservation Research Group, a multidisciplinary network of conservation biologists working on various aspects of the biodiversity of the Western Ghats), and also held affiliate positions at the Zoo Outreach Organisation (ZOO), Coimbatore, India.

Research
Since 2003, Rajeev has been involved in interdisciplinary research that generates information to support conservation decision making in tropical aquatic ecosystems, particularly in the Western Ghats Biodiversity Hotspot. 
His work cuts across multiple disciplines from systematics, to molecular ecology and biogeography, freshwater fisheries and conservation policies. His research group is globally recognized for advancing the knowledge-base on understanding the diversity of freshwater fishes on the Indian subcontinent, resulting in the discovery and description of 21 new species (including three new genera and two new families). Working with collaborators, he has also contributed to solving long-standing taxonomic and nomenclatural issues in Indian fish taxonomy.

Dr. Rajeev is particularly known for his pioneering work that has helped improved our understanding of the diversity, distribution, and conservation of subterranean and groundwater fish species of southern peninsular India. He has been involved in some of the most talked-after fish discoveries including the first subterranean snakehead Aenigmachanna gollum – a living fossil representing a unique family (Aenigmachannidae),, the world's largest cavefish, Neolissochilus pnar  and two unique species of subterranean eel-loaches, Pangio bhujia and Pangio pathala.

Work with IUCN
Rajeev is closely involved with the work of the IUCN Species Survival Commission (IUCN SSC) holding multiple responsibilities in its various specialist groups. He is currently the South Asia Chair of the Freshwater Fish Specialist Group (FFSG); Freshwater Fish Red List Authority Coordinator for the regions of Southern, Northern and Eastern Asia and Oceania; and the Steering Committee member of the Freshwater Fish Specialist Group (FFSG). In addition he is also a member of the Species Survival Commission/World Commission on Protected Areas (SSC/WCPA) Joint Task Force on Biodiversity and Protected Areas; the WCPA Freshwater Specialist Group and the IUCN Conservation Planning Specialist Group.

Work with International Organizations
Rajeev’s expertise has been used by various international organizations including the World Bank, Asian Development Bank, and the International Union for Conservation of Nature (IUCN). He also currently works in an honorary capacity as Advisor on 'Species and Taxonomy' for the Mahseer Trust, an international conservation NGO based in the UK. Rajeev also serves on the advisory board of several leading international conservation organizations including SHOAL Conservation, Fisheries Conservation Foundation, and Freshwater Life.

Publications and Editorial Responsibilities
Rajeev has published in some of the prestigious and top-rated scientific journals in the field of fisheries science, conservation biology and ecology including Trends in Ecology and Evolution, Ecology Letters, Fish and Fisheries, Biological Conservation, Molecular Phylogenetics and Evolution and Journal of Biogeography. As of February 2023, Rajeev has to his credit close to 200 publications (with 3200+ citations and a h-index of 28), and was listed in the Stanford University/Scopus Top 2% Scientists of the World for the years 2020 and 2021.
Rajeev is the Editor for the Asian Freshwater Fish section of Zootaxa and a member of the Editorial Board of Aquatic Conservation: Marine and Freshwater Ecosystems, Biodiversity and Conservation, npj Biodiversity, Journal of Threatened Taxa, and the Croatian Journal of Fisheries.

Legacy
In honour of Rajeev's research contributions to Indian ichthyology, two fish species have been named after him - a snakehead from the northern Western Ghats, Channa rara, and a hill-stream loach Indoreonectes rajeevi.

References

Conservation biologists